Count You of Cao (?–826 BCE) was the seventh ruler of the vassal State of Cao during the Chinese Western Zhou Dynasty (1046–770 BCE). Born Jī Jiāng (姬疆), he was the son of Count Xiao of Cao (曹孝伯) and the younger brother of Count Yi of Cao (曹夷伯). 

Count You was killed by his younger brother Count Dai of Cao (曹戴伯) in 826 BCE after a nine-year reign.

References

Liu Jun Ling and Lin Ganhe, “Timeline of Chinese Historical Families”, Muduo Publishing, Taiwan, 1982. 林干合编，《中国历代各族纪年表》，1982年，台北，木铎出版社

Zhou dynasty nobility
9th-century BC Chinese monarchs